Ejvind Hansen (July 28, 1924 – December 19, 1996) was a Danish sprint canoeist who competed in the late 1940s and the early 1950s. Competing in two Summer Olympics, he won a silver medal in the K-2 1000 m event at London in 1948.

Hansen also won three medals at the ICF Canoe Sprint World Championships with a silver (K-1 4 x 500 m: 1950) and two bronzes (K-1 4 x 500 m and K-2 500 m: both 1948).

References

Ejvind Hansen's profile at Sports Reference.com

1924 births
1996 deaths
Canoeists at the 1948 Summer Olympics
Canoeists at the 1952 Summer Olympics
Danish male canoeists
Olympic canoeists of Denmark
Olympic silver medalists for Denmark
Olympic medalists in canoeing
ICF Canoe Sprint World Championships medalists in kayak
Medalists at the 1948 Summer Olympics